Tooth hemisection is a type of endodontic surgery in which a root and its overlying portion of the crown are separated from the rest of the tooth, and optionally removed.  It contrasts with root resection, where a root is removed while leaving the crown intact, and an apicoectomy, where only the tip of the root is removed.

References

Endodontics